The coat of arms of Ghana was designed by Ghanaian artist Nii Amon Kotei and was introduced on 4 March 1957.

Description
The first quarter, on the upper left shows a sword used by chiefs, and a staff, used by the linguist (known as an okyeame in Akan), at ceremonies.  It is a symbol for the traditional authority of Ghana.
The second quarter shows a representation of Osu Castle on the sea, the presidential palace on the Gulf of Guinea, symbolizes the national government.
The third quarter of the shield shows a cocoa tree, which embodies the  agricultural wealth of Ghana.
The fourth quarter shows a gold mine, which stands for the richness of industrial minerals and natural resources in Ghana.
A gold lion centred on a green St George's Cross with gold fimbriation on the field of blue, represents the continuing link between Ghana and the Commonwealth of Nations.
The crest is a Black star of Africa with gold outline, upon a torse in the national colours.
Supporting the shield are two golden Tawny eagles, with the Order of the Star of Ghana suspended from their necks.
The compartment upon which the supporters stand is composed of a grassy field, under which a scroll bears the national motto of Ghana: Freedom and Justice. The shield stands for a  weapon which  helps to fight poverty, ignorance and  hunger

External links

References 

National symbols of Ghana
Ghana
Ghana
Ghana
Ghana
Ghana
Ghana
Ghana
Ghana